De Principii Evangelikum is the second full-length studio recording released by French black metal band Antaeus.  Counting splits and EPs, it is their ninth recording overall.

Track listing
All lyrics and music by Antaeus, except where noted.

"Intro/Intravenal Call 3:43
"De Principii Evangelikum" 2:53
"Seen Through Skarz" 2:42
"Wormz on Day VI" 2:46
"Nave X Kathedral" 2:18
"Illegal Angelz" 3:06
"Xristik Throne" 3:25
"Sanctus" (Lyrics: Arioch) 2:57
"Blood War III" 3:32
"Untitled" :29

Note that, although "Untitled" isn't on the CD track list, it is still playable as a separate song on the CD itself.

Personnel
Sagoth - bass
Yov - drums
Set - guitar
Thorgon - guitar 
MKM - vocals

Production
Arranged by Antaeus
Produced, recorded, mixed and mastered by Raph 
Recording and mixing at Alpha Omega Studios; Mastering at Germania
Published by Les Editions Hurlantes.

References

2002 albums
Osmose Productions albums
Antaeus (band) albums